Kenneth Wayne Pape (born October 1, 1951) is an American former baseball player who played infielder in the Major Leagues in 1976.  He played for the Texas Rangers.

References

1951 births
Major League Baseball infielders
Texas Rangers players
Texas Longhorns baseball players
Baseball players from Texas
Living people
Midland Cubs players
Pittsfield Rangers players
Sacramento Solons players
Spokane Indians players
Syracuse Chiefs players
Tucson Toros players
Douglas MacArthur High School (San Antonio) alumni